Alectryon excelsus, commonly known as tītoki, is a shiny-leaved tree native to New Zealand. It is in the family Sapindaceae. It lives in coastal and lowland forests throughout most of the North Island and from Banks Peninsula to central Westland in the South Island.

Pākehā initially called it New Zealand oak, but as with many New Zealand native trees, the Māori name is now more common.

Description
It has a twisting trunk with smooth dark bark, spreading branches and pinnate leaves. Adult leaflets do not have marginal teeth or usually have very few, blunt and shallow marginal teeth and usually leaflet margins are downturned, whereas, in juvenile leaflets have leaflets with strong teeth and flat along the edges. The length of this tree leaf are around 10–30 cm. This tree has pale grey to almost black skin with a smooth skin texture and has a stem diameter that reaches 50 cm or more.

Alectryon excelsus produces small purple flowers in spring and the seeds take up to a year to mature.  The female flower has a small anther (‘without pollen’) and a short stemmed sari, whereas, the male flower has a long dangling stamen around the vestigial ovary. The colourful seed is initially contained in a hairy woody capsule which splits revealing bright red and black unpalatable fruit (the black portion being the seed).

Distribution and habitat 
Alectryon excelsus is native to New Zealand but can be found in other places around the world. The tree has been located along street verges in San Francisco.

A. excelsus can be found from the North Island to the Westland area of the South Island. The farthest west would be to about Bruce Bay. It is commonly seen in lowland forests from sea level to 600 metres as well as in coastal forests of the North Island. This tree has been seen all over the South Island.

A. excelsus is likely to grow anywhere from lowland forest areas and exposed coastal area sites along with sandy plains. In sandy plains, Alectryon excelsus is often paired with Beilschmiedia tawa (tawa). 

This tree likes to grow in the places that have a lot of water such as wetlands. Tītoki tree gravitates towards moist soil which contains many nutrients for growth along with fertile alluvial and sandy soils. The location characteristics best suited for this tree are: ‘fertile, well-drained soils along riverbanks and associated terraces'. The plant can grow in conditions from semi-shade to full sun.

Life cycle/phenology 
The ovary develops into a hairy and dense capsule with rusty, brown hair. In about one year, the capsule will mature and divide the red flesh tissue that surrounds one large seed.  From this cleavage, it will show one large seed which is hidden for one year in the capsule and then, the seeds will fall to the ground and will grow into trees if they fall in the right place to support the growth of the tree or the seeds will be spread by New Zealand birds such as the tūī, kererū, kōkako and black birds. This tree will flower from spring to early summer. Some flowers of this tree are bisexual because female flowers and male flowers are not borne on the same tree.

Predators, Parasites and Diseases 
Predators

The fruit of this tree is usually eaten by possums and birds. Some insects enjoy chewing the bark and the leaves. In addition, the leaves on a small tītoki tree will be targeted by deer.

Parasites

The parasite known as the tītoki fruit borer destroys the seeds of this tree by living inside the capsule and eating the seeds.

Uses 
The tītoki tree is one of the native trees in New Zealand that was traditionally planted by Māori. Usually, the pulp fruit from this tree is consumed by Māori while the wood is commonly used for making trainers and wheels because the wood is very elastic and strong.  Furthermore, grains from this tree are used and processed into hair oil and the leaves of this tree will be soaked in the oil to provide a fragrant aroma. The production of oil is very traditional by crushing the seeds of the tītoki tree using a tourniquet-style hemp bag after that Māori will extract it into greenish oil.

People now use the fruit for liquor production. The fruit attributes sweet and astringent taste factors to the alcohol. This product has been distilled and exported to Australia, Fiji, Japan, and the United Kingdom.

References

 Metcalf, Laurie, 2002. A Photographic Guide to Trees of New Zealand. Auckland: New Holland.
 Salmon, J.T., 1986. The Native Trees of New Zealand. Wellington: Heinemann Reed.

External links
 New Zealand Plant Conservation Network: Alectryon excelsus excelsus. Accessed 4 October 2010
 New Zealand Plant Conservation Network: Alectryon excelsus grandis. Accessed 4 October 2010

excelsus
Trees of New Zealand